The Social Affairs Unit is a right-leaning think tank in the United Kingdom. Founded in 1980 as an offshoot of the Institute of Economic Affairs, it publishes books on a variety of social issues. Its website notes that "many SAU supporters are inclined to believe that the generation which fought the Second World War were rather too keen on social engineering over the goals of personal responsibility".

The Unit published Standpoint (2008 - 2021), a monthly cultural and political newsstand magazine first edited by Daniel Johnson (2008 - 2018), Michael Mosbacher (2018 - 2019), Edward Lucas (journalist) (2019 - 2020) and Andreas Campomar (2020 - 2021).

History
The Social Affairs Unit was established in December 1980 as an offshoot of the Institute of Economic Affairs, in order to carry the IEA's economic ideas onto the battleground of sociology. "Within a few years the Social Affairs Unit became independent from the IEA, acquiring its own premises." Founded in 1980 as a registered charity, its founder chairman was Professor Julius Gould, and its founder Director, Dr. Digby Anderson. Anderson often contributed leading articles to UK national newspapers, was Director from 1980 to 2004, when he retired and was succeeded by Michael Mosbacher.

Funding
Documents released as part of the Tobacco Master Settlement Agreement showed that the Unit accepted funding from British American Tobacco in the 1980s.

People

Trustees
Frank Sharratt
Prof. Simon Green
William Norton

Other
Director: Michael Mosbacher (2004 - 2019)
Media Fellow: Richard D. North (2004 - 2012)

Advisory Council
Dr. Digby Anderson
Dr. Alejandro Chafuen
Professor Christie Davies (died 2017)
Professor Adrian Furnham 
Professor Jacques Garello
Professor Nathan Glazer (died 2019)
Dr. Simon Green
Professor Leonard Liggio (died 2014)
Professor David Martin (died 2019)
Professor Antonio Martino (died 2022)
Professor Michael Novak (died 2017)
John O'Sullivan

See also
List of UK think tanks

Books

References

External links
The Social Affairs Unit

Political and economic think tanks based in the United Kingdom